The 1902–03 Northern Football League season was the fourteenth in the history of the Northern Football League, a football competition in Northern England.

Clubs

The league featured 10 clubs which competed in the last season, along with three new clubs: 
 Middlesbrough A
 Newcastle United A
 Sunderland A

League table

References

1902-03
1902–03 in English association football leagues